Sahowala is a town in Sambrial Tehsil, Sialkot District, Punjab, Pakistan. It is located between the Upper Chenab Canal and the Marala Ravi Link Canal of the Marala Headworks project. Demographically, the town has a Union Council which is one of the largest councils in Sialkot, having a population around 20,000 which covers six neighbouring villages. Many residents are farmers, while others work abroad and serve in the industry and government. The town is close to the Sialkot Tanneries Zone. Minhaj ul Quran Islamic Library is the public library, along Noor Mosque, which has the highest minaret in the Sialkot District. This village has a history of more than 800 years. Mughal Colony was also established in Sahowala.

Location
Head Marala, the source of both canals around the village, is just  to the north. The Lahore Sialkot motorway ends at Sahowala (1km away from Sahowala train station).

Map

Community and general information
The people of Sahowala are well educated, with a literacy rate of 80%. Urdu, Punjabi and English are all spoken in the town.

There are two government high schools for boys and girls, along with private schools and four madrasas for teaching the Quran. The female literacy rate is about 75%. The basic caste system is still active, and national elections are based on caste (Bradari).

Basic Facilities
The Pakistan Telecommunication Company Limited (PTCL) provides the main network of land-line telephone service, and all major carriers, like Ufone, Warid, and Mobilink, provide mobile services. Broadband Internet access is available by PTCL. Gas facilities have existed since 2009, and Sahowala has a utility store providing basic commodities. Recently, the main road from Sahowala village to Adda Sahowala was reconstructed. Two water filtration plants provide pure water. An ambulance service is available around the clock, and a basic health service provides free medical care.

Traditional fairs
 Urs Shah Anayat Badshah 
 Urs Sailani Shah
 Urs Masjid Ghosia

References

Cities and towns in Sialkot District